"DJ Play a Love Song" is a song by American entertainer Jamie Foxx. It was written by Sean Garrett, Jamal Jones, and Jason Perry for his second album, Unpredictable (2005), while production was helmed by Garrett and Jones under his production moniker Polow da Don. The song features additional vocals by rapper Twista. It was released as the album's second single in early 2006. A video for the song co-stars America's Next Top Model winner Eva Pigford.

Chart performance
DJ Play a Love Song debuted at number 90 on the US Billboard Hot 100 chart, on the week of May 6, 2006. After climbing for the chart for 12 weeks, the song eventually reached its peak at number 45 on the chart. The song also peaked at number five on the US Hot R&B/Hip-Hop Songs chart in June 2006. On December 11, 2006, the single was certified gold by the Recording Industry Association of America (RIAA) for sales of over 500,000 copies in the United States.

The song was released in the UK as a download only third single from the album but failed to chart.

Formats and track listings
US download
 "DJ Play A Love Song (No Rap version) - 3:51 

UK download #1
 "DJ Play A Love Song (Remix version 1 - Dirty) - 4:08 

UK download #2
 "DJ Play A Love Song (Remix version 2 - Dirty) - 3:50

Charts

Weekly charts

Year-end charts

Certifications

Release history

References

External links
Music video on YouTube

2006 singles
Jamie Foxx songs
Song recordings produced by Polow da Don
Music videos directed by Paul Hunter (director)
Songs written by Sean Garrett